Ptychocroca lineabasalis is a species of moth of the family Tortricidae. It is found in Chile (Santiago Province, Maule Region, Bío Bío Region and Valparaíso Region).

Adults are on wing from October to December.

Etymology
The species name refers to the short linear portion of the ventral margin of the valva.

References

Moths described in 2003
Euliini
Moths of South America
Taxa named by Józef Razowski
Endemic fauna of Chile